Tillmann Grove (born 9 March 1988) is a German former professional footballer who played as a defender. He played for Finnish Veikkausliiga side FF Jaro.

References

Living people
1988 births
German footballers
Footballers from Hamburg
Association football defenders
Germany youth international footballers
Regionalliga players
Veikkausliiga players
FF Jaro players
Hamburger SV II players
FC Eintracht Norderstedt 03 players
German expatriate footballers
German expatriate sportspeople in Finland
Expatriate footballers in Finland